Makhach Gadzhiyevich Gadzhiyev (born 18 October 1987) is a former Russian professional footballer.

Career
He made his professional debut in RFPL in 2005 for FC Krylia Sovetov Samara.

On 14 September 2012 he signed a one-year contract, with the option of another two-years, with Ukrainian football club Tavriya. After one year, though, he returned to Russian championship after signing for FC Amkar Perm. After six months Gadzhiyev left Amkar Perm, and moved on a free transfer back to Anzhi Makhachkala, on a contract till the end of the season.

Legal issues
On 17 November 2017, Gadzhiyev was convicted of fraud by the Kizilyurt court. At the same time that he joined Anzhi in 2010 he also was serving in a local police department (on paper), even though he was not in reality performing any police work, but just collecting a paycheck. He was given a 2-year conditional sentence with a 1-year probation.

References

External links
 

1987 births
People from Kizilyurt
Russian people of Dagestani descent
Living people
Russian footballers
Association football midfielders
FC Spartak Moscow players
PFC Krylia Sovetov Samara players
FC Saturn Ramenskoye players
FC Rubin Kazan players
FC Anzhi Makhachkala players
SC Tavriya Simferopol players
FC Amkar Perm players
Russian Premier League players
Ukrainian Premier League players
Russian expatriate footballers
Expatriate footballers in Ukraine
People convicted of fraud
Sportspeople from Dagestan